Saw Phaik Hwa (born 1957 in Kuala Lumpur, Malaysia) is a Malaysian-born Singaporean businesswoman. She was the President and Chief Executive Officer of the SMRT Corporation from December 2002 to 6 January 2012. Prior to that, she had 19 years of experience at DFS Venture Singapore (Pte) Ltd.

Education
Saw received an honours degree in biochemistry from the University of Singapore.

Career

DFS Ventures
From 1984 to 2002, Saw served as Regional President for DFS Venture Singapore (Pte) Ltd. She left the company in 2002 as a result of budget cuts.

SMRT Corporation
In 2002, Saw became the President of SMRT.

In December 2011, Saw's resignation as the president of SMRT in the midst of public anger over two train breakdowns that caused commuters to be stranded. These breakdowns were the worst since the transit system was started in 1987.

On 6 January 2012, Saw resigned as a director of SMRT, following which former Army General Desmond Kuek was appointed as the President and Group Chief Executive Officer.

Auric Pacific
On 1 May 2012, Saw was appointed to be the CEO of Auric Pacific, specializing in Delifrance, Sunshine and Topone, including the best-selling Food Junction. She retired from this post effective 30 April 2015.

Criticism

During her tenure as head of SMRT, Saw was accused of under-investing in maintenance of trains and tracks. This led to a culmination of train breakdowns, especially in 2015, causing delays to hundreds of thousands of commuters.

References

1957 births
Singaporean people of Hokkien descent
Mass Rapid Transit (Singapore)
Living people
Singaporean chief executives
Singaporean women in business